Jumper or Jumpers may refer to:

Clothing
Jumper (sweater), a long-sleeve article of clothing; also called a top, pullover, or sweater
A waist-length top garment of dense wool, part of the Royal Navy uniform and the uniform of the United States Navy
Jumper (dress) (U.S. English; known elsewhere as a pinafore dress), a sleeveless dress intended to be worn over a top or blouse
jumpsuit - One piece outfit.

People
 Betty Mae Tiger Jumper (1923–2011), first female chief of the Seminole Tribe of Florida
 Hunter Jumper (born 1989), American soccer player
 John Jumper (Seminole chief) (1820–1896), principal chief of the Seminoles from 1849 to 1865
 John P. Jumper (born 1945), former Chief of Staff of the United States Air Force
 William Jumper (1660–1715), Royal Navy officer

Arts, media, and entertainment
 Jumper (novel), a novel by Steven Gould
 Jumper (2008 film), a 2008 film adaptation of the novel
 Jumper: Griffin's Story (video game), a video game based on the film
 Jumper: Griffin's Story (novel), a novel based on the film
 Jumper (1991 film), a pornographic film
 Jumpers (play), a play by Tom Stoppard
 "Jumpers", an episode of the television series Zoboomafoo
 Jumpers (Wild Cards), characters in the Wild Cards series of books
 Jumper (short story), a short story by Stephen King

Music
 Jumper (band), a Swedish pop group 1996-2001
 "Jumper" (Third Eye Blind song), 1998
 "Jumper" (Hardwell and W&W song), 2013
 "Jumper", by Capsule from More! More! More!, 2008
"Jumper", by Rudimental from Ground Control, 2021
 "Jumpers", by Sleater-Kinney from The Woods, 2005

Computers and software
 Jumper (computing), an electrical connector
 Jumper 2.0, open source collaborative enterprise search software

Electronics
 Jumper (BEAM), in BEAM robotics, a robot that moves by jumping
 Jump wire (also known as jumper, jumper wire, jumper cable, DuPont wire or cable)

Religious groups
 Jumpers, members of the Welsh Methodist Revival

Sports
 Jump shot (basketball)
 Show jumper, a type of equestrian competition, or the horses that compete in same
 Jumper, a person who participates in parachuting

Other meanings
 Jumper (person), a person who kills themself by jumping from a height
 Jumper ant, venomous ant of Australian temperate regions
 Citroën Jumper, a French van
 IAI JUMPER, a self-contained missile launcher system
 A common name for Jumping spiders

See also
 Jumper cable (disambiguation)
 
 Jumpertown, Mississippi, a town, United States